Grímur Hákonarson (born 1977) is an Icelandic film director and screenwriter. His first feature film was Summerland from 2010, for which Grímur was nominated for the Edda Award for Best Screenplay. His next feature film was Rams, about two estranged brothers on the Icelandic countryside who come together to save their sheep. The film was selected for the Un Certain Regard section of the 2015 Cannes Film Festival and won the Un Certain Regard Award.

Filmography
 Varði Goes Europe (2002) (Documentary)
 Last Words of Hreggviður (2004) (Short)
 Slavek the Shit (2005) (Short)
 Wrestling (Bræðrabylta) (2007) (Short)
 Summerland (Sumarlandið) (2010)
 A Pure Heart (Hreint hjarta) (2012) (Documentary)
 Rams (Hrútar) (2015)
 The County (2019)

References

External links
 Grímur Hákonarson at the Icelandic Film Centre
'''

1977 births
Grimur Hakonarson
Grimur Hakonarson
Living people